Expodroom is a multi-purpose arena in Bree, Belgium.  Expodroom holds 4,000 people.  It hosted the home games of the former basketball club Bree B.B.C.  It has also hosted Fed Cup matches.

External links
Venue information

Basketball venues in Belgium
Indoor arenas in Belgium
Sports venues in Limburg (Belgium)
Buildings and structures in Limburg (Belgium)